Michael Yates may refer to:

Michael Yates (television designer) (1919–2001), English television, opera, and stage designer
Michael Yates (economist) (born 1946), American economist and labor educator
J. Michael Yates (born 1938), Canadian poet, dramatist and fiction writer
Mike Yates, fictional character in Doctor Who

See also
Michael Yeats (1921–2007), Irish politician